Thomas Gill (1788 – 20 October 1861) was a British Whig politician and industrialist.

Born in 1788 in Tavistock, Devon, Gill founded the Milbay Soaps Works in 1818 and, at some point, worked in the Tavistock Iron Works. He was also chairman of the South Devon Railway Company.

Gill was elected a Whig Member of Parliament for Plymouth at the 1841 general election but stepped down at the next election in 1847.

References

External links
 

UK MPs 1841–1847
Whig (British political party) MPs for English constituencies
1788 births
1861 deaths
Politicians from Tavistock
South Devon Railway Company
Members of the Parliament of the United Kingdom for Plymouth